Leslie Cole (born February 16, 1987) is an American sprint athlete. She was part of the USA team that won the silver medal at the 2012 IAAF World Indoor Championships.

References

External links
IAAF Profile

1987 births
Living people
American female sprinters
World Athletics Indoor Championships medalists
21st-century American women